The Barton Avenue Residential District is a U.S. historic district (designated as such on August 21, 1992) located in Rockledge, Florida. The district runs from 11 through 59 Barton Avenue. It contains 41 historic buildings.

References

External links
Brevard County listings at National Register of Historic Places

Houses in Brevard County, Florida
National Register of Historic Places in Brevard County, Florida
Historic districts on the National Register of Historic Places in Florida